Kobus is a surname. Notable people with the surname include:

 Agnieszka Kobus (born 1990), Polish rower
 Arthur Kobus (1879–1945), German general during the Second World War
 Waldemar Kobus (born 1966), German actor

See also
 

Polish-language surnames